Stéphane Charbonneau (born June 27, 1970) is a Canadian retired professional ice hockey right winger. He played 2 games in the National Hockey League during the 1991–92 season. The rest of his career, which lasted from 1991 to 1997, was spent in the minor leagues.

Early life 
Charbonneau was born in Sainte-Adèle, Quebec. He played junior hockey with the Hull Olympiques, Shawinigan Cataractes, and Chicoutimi Saguenéens.

Career 
During his career, Charbonneau played for the Quebec Nordiques of the National Hockey League (NHL). After retiring, he worked as the head varsity ice hockey coach at Garnet Valley High School.

Career statistics

Regular season and playoffs

References

External links
 

1970 births
Living people
Baton Rouge Kingfish players
Canadian ice hockey right wingers
Chicoutimi Saguenéens (QMJHL) players
Cornwall Aces players
Erie Panthers players
Flint Generals players
Fort Wayne Komets players
French Quebecers
Halifax Citadels players
Hull Olympiques players
Ice hockey people from Quebec
Mississippi Sea Wolves players
Montreal Roadrunners players
Philadelphia Bulldogs players
Phoenix Roadrunners (IHL) players
Portland Pirates players
Quebec Nordiques players
Shawinigan Cataractes players
Undrafted National Hockey League players